The 1963–64 season was the 80th football season in which Dumbarton competed at a Scottish national level, entering the Scottish Football League, the Scottish Cup and the Scottish League Cup.  In addition Dumbarton competed in the Stirlingshire Cup.

Scottish Second Division

While never really considered at any time as serious challengers, manager Jackie Fearn guided Dumbarton to a respectable 6th place in Division 2 with 38 points, a distant 29 behind champions Morton.

Scottish League Cup

In the League Cup, with 2 wins and a draw from their sectional ties, Dumbarton failed to qualify for the knock out stages.

Scottish Cup

In the Scottish Cup, after an easy first round win, Dumbarton were not disgraced in their loss in the second round to Division 1 opponents Motherwell.

Stirlingshire Cup
Dumbarton lost out to Stenhousemuir in the first round of the county cup.

Friendlies

Player statistics

Squad 

|}

Source:

Transfers
Amongst those players joining and leaving the club were the following:

Players in

Players out 

Source:

References

Dumbarton F.C. seasons
Scottish football clubs 1963–64 season